Epijapyx is a genus of diplurans in the family Japygidae.

Species
 Epijapyx corcyraeus (Verhoeff, 1904)

References

Diplura